Massive Mountain is situated in Banff National Park, Alberta Canada. It is located in the Massive Range and was named in 1918 for its massive size. It however is not the highest summit in the range, that belongs to Mount Brett.


Geology

The mountain is composed of sedimentary rock laid down during the Precambrian to Jurassic periods. Formed in shallow seas, this sedimentary rock was pushed east and over the top of younger rock during the Laramide orogeny.

Climate

Based on the Köppen climate classification, it is located in a subarctic climate with cold, snowy winters, and mild summers. Winter temperatures can drop below -20 °C with wind chill factors below -30 °C.

References

External links
 
 Parks Canada web site: Banff National Park
 Massive Mountain weather: Mountain Forecast

Two-thousanders of Alberta
Mountains of Banff National Park